Svend Nielsen (27 September 1892 – 15 March 1957) was a Danish wrestler. He competed at the 1920 and 1924 Summer Olympics.

References

External links
 

1892 births
1957 deaths
Olympic wrestlers of Denmark
Wrestlers at the 1920 Summer Olympics
Wrestlers at the 1924 Summer Olympics
Danish male sport wrestlers
Sportspeople from Aarhus